The Bauta River is a river in Puerto Rico. It flows through Morovis municipality and, like the Sana Muerto River, is a tributary of the Río Grande de Manatí. From Morovis, it flows through Ciales and Orocovis, Puerto Rico.

See also

 Rivers in Puerto Rico

References

External links
 USGS Hydrologic Unit Map – Caribbean Region (1974)

Rivers of Puerto Rico